Qlaileh is a town in the Tyre District in South Lebanon.

Name
According to E. H. Palmer in 1881, the name Leileh comes from a female proper name; it also means “night”.

History
In 1875, Victor Guérin  describes a ruin to the east of the village, which he calls Kh. Kleileh. "The upright of oil-presses, a winepress cut in the rock, with two compartments, one round and one square, and three broken sarcophagi, are all that remain here. A short distance south of this place he found another ruined hamlet, having a cistern cut in the rock, and an enormous millstone lying on the ground, called Kh. Ratieh".

In 1881, the PEF's Survey of Western Palestine (SWP) described it: "A small well-built stone village, containing about 50 Moslems, surrounded by olives and arable ground. The water supply is from 'Ain Zaheiriyeh."

On 13 May 2021, shortly after the beginning of the 2021 Israel–Palestine crisis, a number of rockets  - apparently Soviet-era short-range Grad projectiles - were fired from the coastal area of Qlaileh just South of the Palestinian refugee camp of Rashidieh towards northern Israel. According to some reports, three rockets were involved which all fell into the Mediterranean Sea, causing no damage According to other sources, altogether five missiles were launched and two of them crashed onto Lebanese grounds, while three got lost off the coast.

References

Bibliography

External links
Qlaileh, Localiban
Survey of Western Palestine, Map 1:  IAA, Wikimedia commons 

Populated places in Tyre District